RVC may refer to:

in education:
Rock Valley College, a community college in Rockford, Illinois
Royal Victoria College, a women's residential college of McGill University, Montreal
Royal Veterinary College,  veterinary school in London

in other uses:
Russian Venture Company
Rockville Centre, New York
Reconfigurable video coding
Reticulated vitreous carbon